Vladimir Gennadievich Sprindzuk (Russian Владимир Геннадьевич Спринджук, Belarusian Уладзімір Генадзевіч Спрынджук, 22 July 1936, Minsk – 26 July 1987) was a Soviet-Belarusian number theorist.

Education and career
Sprindzuk studied from 1954 at Belarusian State University and from 1959 at the University of Vilnius. There he received in 1963 his Ph.D. with Jonas Kubilius as primary advisor and Yuri Linnik as secondary advisor and with thesis entitled (in Russian) "Метрические теоремы о дыяфантавых приближение алгебраическими числами ограниченной степени" (Metric Theorems of Diophantine Approximations and Approximations by Algebraic Numbers of Bounded Degree). In 1965 he received his Russian doctorate of sciences (Doctor Nauk) from the State University of Leningrad with thesis entitled (in Russian) "Проблема Малера в метрической теории чисел" (The Mahler Problem in the Metric Theory of Numbers). In 1969 he became a professor and head of the academic division of number theory at the Mathematical Institute of the National Academy of Sciences of Belarus in Minsk and lectured at the Belarusian State University in Minsk. He was a visiting professor at the University of Paris, at the Polish Academy of Sciences and at the Slovak Academy of Sciences.

Sprindzuk's research deals with Diophantine approximation, Diophantine equations and transcendental numbers. While a first year undergraduate student, he published his first paper, in which he solved a problem of Aleksandr Khinchin, and wrote to Khinchin about the solution. Another important influence was the Leningrad number theorist Yuri Linnik, who was Sprindzuk's advisor for his Russian doctorate of sciences. In 1965 Sprindzuk proved a conjecture of Mahler, that almost all real numbers are S-numbers of Type 1 — Mahler had previously proved that almost all real numbers are S-numbers. Sprindzuk generalized an important theorem proved by Wolfgang M. Schmidt.

He was elected in 1969 a corresponding member and in 1986 a full member of the National Academy of Sciences of Belarus. Beginning in 1970 he was on the editorial staff of Acta Arithmetica. In 1970 he was an Invited Speaker at the ICM in Nice with talk New applications of analytic and p-adic methods in diophantine approximations.

Selected publications

Articles

Books
 Mahler’s Problem in metric number theory. American Mathematical Society 1969 (translation from Russian original, Minsk 1967)
 Metric theory of Diophantine approximations. Winston and Sons, Washington D.C. 1979 (translation from Russian original, published Nauka, Moscow 1977)
 Classical Diophantine Equations. Springer, Lecture Notes in Mathematics vol. 1559, 1993 (translation from Russian original, Moscow 1982)

References

External links
 Sprinzduk's publication list from numbertheory.org

Number theorists
Soviet mathematicians
1936 births
1987 deaths
Scientists from Minsk